Singapore competed at the 2011 Commonwealth Youth Games in Isle of Man from 7 to 13 September 2011.The Singapore National Olympic Committee selected 6 competitors.	Tan Wei-An Terry won bronze medal in the Men's Vault CIII event of Gymnastics

References

Nations at the 2011 Commonwealth Youth Games
2011 in Singaporean sport